Twenty Houses of the Zodiac (1979) was an English-language anthology of twenty selected international science fiction short stories for the 37th World Science Fiction Convention (or Worldcon). It was edited by Maxim Jakubowski and published by New English Library. It contained stories from an international selection of  authors, some who had never had their work translated into English before. Most of the works are unique to the collection and were never previously printed or later reprinted.

Contents
Twenty Houses of the Zodiac (1979) - Introductory essay by Maxim Jakubowski
Oh, For a Closer Brush with God (AKA Bill Carter Takes Over) (1979) - A short story by Brian W. Aldiss. 
Un Fel de Spatiu ("A Kind of Space") (1974) - A short story written by Ion Hobana and translated by Maxim Jakubowksi and "Sonia Florens" (Dolorès Jakubowski). 
Dealers in Light and Darkness (1979) - A short story by "Cherry Wilder". 
Der Riss in der Zeit ("A Hole in Time") (1979) - A short story written by Gerd Maximovic and translated from German by David Britt. 
Maree Haute ("High Tide") (1978) - A short story written by French-Canadian author Élisabeth Vonarburg and translated from French by Maxim Jakubowksi.
I Can Teleport Myse-f to Anywhere (1979) - A short story by Robert Sheckley.
Plus Lourd Que le Sommeil ("Heavier Than Sleep") (1979) - A short story by "Philippe Curval".
Un Avocat pour Dolorès ("An Avocado Pear for Dolorès") (1979) - A short story by "Adam Barnett-Foster" (a pen name of Maxim Jakubowski) and translated from French by "Sonia Florens" (Dolorès Jakubowski).
Gigantskaya Flyuctuatsiya ("The Gigantic Fluctuation") (1962) - A short story written by Arkady and Boris Strugatsky and translated from Russian by Gladys Evans.
Zodiac 2000 (1978) - A short story by J. G. Ballard. 
Een Zonsopgang ("A Sunrise") (1963) - A short story written by Belgian poet Hugo Raes and translated from Flemish by R. B. Powell.
Ai no Kagi ("Love Keys") (1958) - A short story written by Shinichi Hoshi and translated from Japanese by Noriyoshi Saito & Maxim Jakubowksi.
The Cottage of Eternity (1979) - A novelette by Bob Shaw. 
Ice Two (1979) - A short story written by Daniel Walther and translated from French by Maxim Jakubowksi. It has the same title in the French and English versions.
The Brass Monkey (1979) - A short story by John Sladek. 
El Jardin de Alabastro ("The Alabaster Garden") (1977) - A short story written by Spanish author Teresa Inglés and translated from the Spanish by Maxim Jakubowksi.
Idiosyncrasies (1979) - A short story by Maxim Jakubowski.
Take Me Down the River (1979) - A short story by Sam Lundwall 
Biała śmierć ("The White Death") (from Lem's collection Bajki Robotów / "Fables for Robots") (1964) - A short story written by Stanislaw Lem and translated by Michael Kandel. A race of intelligent robots hide from Humanity by digging a beautiful city under the surface of their planet. When a rocket crashes into the surface, they quickly destroy it to keep curious and violent Humans away. However, the only surviving life-form aboard - The White Death - will soon be the end of them.   
Crossing into Cambodia (1979) - A short story by Michael Moorcock. A Russian political officer reminisces about leading a Cossack cavalry troop into Cambodia during the Third World War.

Printings
Oh, For a Closer Brush with God was later reprinted under the title of Bill Carter Takes Over in A Romance of the Equator: The Best Fantasy Stories of Brian W. Aldiss (1989).

Un Fel de Spatiu ("A Kind of Space") had first been printed in the Romanian magazine  Viața Românească in 1974.

Marée Haute ("High Tide") had previously been published in Requiem #19 (1978), a Canadian magazine.

Gigantskaya Flyuctuatsiya ("The Gigantic Fluctuation") had first been published with their novel Stazhery ("The Probationers", AKA "Space Apprentice") (Young Guard publishing house; 1962). It was later reprinted by itself in the Russian anthology Journey Across Three Worlds (Mir; 1973).

Zodiac 2000 had previously been published in  Ambit #75 (1978).

Een Zonsopgang ("A Sunrise") had previously been published in Vandaag #10 (1963), a Dutch magazine.

Ai no Kagi ("Love Keys") had been first published in the collaborative science fiction magazine  Uchūjin in 1958.

El Jardin de Alabastro ("The Alabaster Garden") had been previously printed in Nueva Dimension No. 86 (February, 1977), a Spanish-language science fiction and fantasy magazine printed by Ediciones Dronte.

Biała śmierć ("The White Death") is a selection from Lem's omnibus Mortal Engines (Seabury Press 1977), which had been translated entirely by Michael Kandel.

Crossing Into Cambodia was later reprinted in My Experiences in the Third World War (Savoy; 1980).

 / 9780450043338

References

1979 anthologies
Science fiction anthologies
New English Library books